The U4 is a line of the Hamburg U-Bahn, which opened in 2012, serving 12 stations.

Route
The U4 is the newest line of the Hamburg U-Bahn and the first line that is to form as a branch of an older, existing line. It shares the U2's tracks from Billstedt to the major transfer station Jungfernstieg, located in the city center, branching off 165 meters before the station and stopping at the outer tracks of the four-platform station. It then traverses under the Neustadt in a far-swinging 180° bend and reaches the newly built Überseequartier station in HafenCity after about 3 kilometers. The following station, HafenCity Universität lies about 650 meters to the east in the Elbtorquartier. On 7 December 2018 the line was extended 1.3 km eastward, to a new terminus at Elbbrücken, allowing for a future S-Bahn connection with lines S3/S31.

The line runs almost entirely underground, only surfacing at Elbbrücken and Billstedt at both ends. There is also a short uncovered section east of Burgstraße.

Projected extensions

Elbbrücken
In January 2013, the government of Hamburg decided to build the U4 one more station to Elbbrücken. At Elbbrücken, the U4 will have connections to the Hamburg S-Bahn. In April 2015, the construction works for the extension of the U4 started. The new station at Elbbrücken opened on 7 December 2018.

Eastern extension from Horner Rennbahn to Dannerallee
At Horner Rennbahn, the U4 is planned to branch off of the U2 and continue east under the Manshardtstraße. Two new stations are planned along this extension: Stoltenstraße, east of the existing bus stop with the same name, and Dannerallee, west of the bus station with the same name in the area of a local shopping center. Following the two stations, the construction of a two-track storage facility is also planned, which is to be built in such a way as to allow a later extension of the line towards Jenfeld. Overall, the extension to Dannerallee is expected to connect the households of around 13,000 people to the metro network. By 2030 the Hochbahn expects 13,600 daily passengers on the line.

Gallery

References

External links 

 Hochbahn: U4

Hamburg U-Bahn lines
Railway lines opened in 2012
2012 establishments in Germany